This article contains an overview of the year 1992 in athletics.

International events
 African Championships
 Balkan Games
 European Indoor Championships
 Olympic Games
 Pan Arab Games
 World Cross Country Championships
 World Junior Championships

World records

Men

Women

Men's best year performers

100 metres

200 metres

400 metres

800 metres

1,500 metres

Mile

3,000 metres

5,000 metres

10,000 metres

Half Marathon

Marathon

110m hurdles

400m hurdles

3,000m steeplechase

High jump

Long jump

Triple jump

Discus

Shot put

Hammer

Javelin (new design)

Pole vault

Decathlon

Women's best year performers

60 metres

100 metres

200 metres

400 metres

800 metres

1,500 metres

Mile

3,000 metres

5,000 metres

10,000 metres

Half marathon

Marathon

60m hurdles

100m hurdles

400m hurdles

High jump

Long jump

Triple jump

Shot put

Javelin (old design)

Heptathlon

Births
June 1, Gianmarco Tamberi, Italian athlete 
June 28, Elaine Thompson-Herah,  Jamaican athlete 
August 27 Daniel Ståhl  Swedish athlete

Deaths
March 1 — Howard Payne (60), English hammer thrower (b. 1931)
July 7 — Josy Barthel (65), Luxembourgish runner (b. 1927)
August 19 — Karl Storch (77), German hammer thrower (b. 1913)
October 29 — Bill McChesney, Jr. (33), American long-distance runner (b. 1959)

References
 Year Lists
 1992 Year Rankings
 Association of Road Racing Statisticians

 
Athletics (track and field) by year